Decima is a proprietary game engine made by Guerrilla Games and released in November 2013, that includes tools and features like artificial intelligence and game physics. It is compatible with 4K resolution and high-dynamic-range imaging, used for games on PlayStation 4, PlayStation 5 and Microsoft Windows.

History 
The first game the engine was used for was Killzone: Shadow Fall. In June 2015, Guerrilla Games announced that Horizon: Zero Dawn was using the engine for development. In August 2015, Until Dawn was announced to be using the engine along with Havok physics. In December 2015, Until Dawn: Rush of Blood used the engine along with PlayStation VR.  In June 2016, Hideo Kojima announced preparation for Kojima Productions' independent game Death Stranding, inspecting two engine candidates, of which the latter had been used to create the first teaser that was unveiled at the Electronic Entertainment Expo 2016 conference. After receiving the Industry Icon award at The Game Awards 2016, Kojima premiered a trailer for the game with the engine's logo. At PlayStation Experience, Kojima had announced that he had partnered with Guerrilla Games, using the engine for development on Death Stranding.

According to executive producer Angie Smets, Decima was originally known simply as "the engine" by Guerrilla employees, as there were initially no plans to publicly offer this technology to game developers outside of the company. However, the newly forged partnership with Kojima Productions meant that Guerrilla suddenly had to give the engine a name for marketing purposes; they chose to name it after Dejima, the Japanese island where a Dutch Empire trading post appeared in the 17th century and once symbolized the strong trade relations between Japan and the Netherlands.

Guerrilla's most recent title, Horizon Forbidden West, used an updated version of the engine. The game was released for PlayStation 4 and PlayStation 5 on February 18, 2022.

Features 
During PlayStation Experience in December 2016, it was revealed that the engine has artificial intelligence, game physics and logic tools, featuring resources for creating entire worlds. It is capable of 4K resolution and high-dynamic-range imaging.

Games

References 

 
2013 software
3D graphics software
Global illumination software
Guerrilla Games
Video game engines
Software development kits
Video game development
Virtual reality